Ömer Hasan Şişmanoğlu (born 1 August 1989) is a Turkish professional footballer who plays as a striker for Denizlispor.

Şişmanoğlu has won the Süper Lig once and the Hamburg Cup once.

Career

Early career 
Şişmanoğlu started his football career at SC Vatan Gücü Football Club based in Hamburg. He also played for Wilhelmsburger SV 93, FC St. Pauli, Türk Gücü Hamburg, Hamburg Türksport, and Altonaer FC von 1893. He played for the Hamburg U-19 team until the 2006–07 season.

FC St. Pauli 
Şişmanoğlu joined FC St. Pauli on 1 July 2007 on a free transfer. He made his debut for FC St. Pauli in the 2. Bundesliga on 14 December 2007 against Mainz 05.

Kayserispor 
On 23 June 2009, Şişmanoğlu left FC St. Pauli and signed a four-year deal with Kayserispor. He played his first match against Gençlerbirliği in August 2009. He started his first match for Kayserispor against Bursaspor on 6 December 2009. In that game, he scored his first league goal. In the 2009–10 season, he played in 25 matches and scored seven goals. The highlight of that season was the match against Bucaspor in which he scored two goals.

Antalyaspor 
Şişmanoğlu moved on loan to Antalyaspor on 5 September 2012. In the 2012–13 season, he scored 14 of Antalyaspor's 29 goals in all competitions. He also scored six of those goals in five matches in the Turkish Cup. On 1 July 2013, Antalyaspor purchased Şişmanoğlu from Kayserispor for £450,000.

Beşiktaş 
Five days after signing for Antalyaspor, Şişmanoğlu moved to Beşiktaş for £1.49 million. He scored on his debut for Besiktas against Eskişehirspor, which ended 1–0 in favor of Beşiktaş, on 5 October 2013.

Eskişehirspor 
On 4 August 2014, Şişmanoğlu moved on loan to Eskişehirspor for the 2014–15 season. He played 22 times in the league, scoring nine goals. His first goal came on 26 October 2014 in a 4–2 loss to Mersin İdmanyurdu. His goal was the opener on the day, coming in the third minute. His side went 2–0 up, but concede once in the first half, and three times in the second.

Konyaspor 
After returning from his loan to Eskisehirspor, he was loaned out again, this time to Konyaspor, on 28 August 2015. He played 11 times in the league, but never found the net. His league debut came on 27 September 2015 in a 2–0 win against Mersin İdmanyurdu. He assisted on Samuel Holmén's 85th minute doubler, having come on off the bench only 14 minutes earlier.

Return to Antalyaspor 
On 18 January 2016, his loan was terminated with Konyaspor and he was sent out again on loan again to Antalyaspor. In ten league matches with his former club, the striker scored six goals.

Göztepe 
On 7 August 2017, after returning from his loan to Antalyaspor, Şişmanoğlu was sold to Göztepe on a free transfer. His first league goal came on 14 October 2017 in a 3–1 away win against his former club Antalyaspor. That goal came in the 92nd minute of the match, a third for his side. It was an immediate impact, having been brought on for Adis Jahović just five minutes earlier.

Personal life 
Şişmanoğlu was born in the Wilhelmsburg quarter of Hamburg, West Germany. He holds German citizenship.

Honours
FC St. Pauli II
Hamburg Cup: 2007–08

Beşiktaş
Süper Lig: 2016–17

References

External links
 
 
 
 
 

1989 births
Living people
German people of Turkish descent
Footballers from Hamburg
Turkish footballers
German footballers
Association football forwards
Turkey under-21 international footballers
Turkey B international footballers
2. Bundesliga players
Süper Lig players
TFF First League players
FC St. Pauli players
Yeni Malatyaspor footballers
Antalyaspor footballers
Beşiktaş J.K. footballers
Eskişehirspor footballers
Konyaspor footballers
Kayserispor footballers
Denizlispor footballers